The Carpathian Sich (Orhanizatsiia narodnoii oborony Karpatska Sich – National Defense Organization Carpathian Sich) were irregular soldiers of the short-lived state of Carpatho-Ukraine.

History

The Carpathian Sich was formed on 9 November 1938 under the newly elected moderate Ukrainian nationalist prime minister of the Subcarpathian Autonomous Region within Czechoslovakia, Avgustyn Voloshyn. The Carpathian Sich was based in Khust which became a temporary capital since Uzhhorod, Mukacheve and Berehove became part of Hungary according to the First Vienna Award. The organization was led by Dmytro Klympush and Ivan Rohach as a deputy of the first and performed paramilitary and police duties in adjustment with Czechoslovak forces. Although the Carpathian Sich's leaders were local Transcarpathian Ukrainian nationalists, most of its forces consisted of Ukrainian activists who crossed over the mountains from Galicia.  

In opposition to the government of Avgustyn Voloshyn,  it also engaged in cultural work such as publishing a newspaper and operating a theater, the Shooting Star (Letiucha Estrada). On 22 January 1939, in Khust were held the 20th anniversary festivities commemorating the 1919 Act Zluky (Act of Union). As Czechoslovakia fell apart on March 14, 1939, according to Paul R. Magocsi, the Sich with German encouragement prepared a coup against the Carpatho-Ukrainian government of Avgustyn Voloshyn and attacked Czechoslovak troops, resulting in the deaths of several Czechoslovak soldiers and many Sich members.

On March 15, 1939, Hungary invaded Carpatho-Ukraine. Avgustyn Voloshyn chose to flee to Romania along with the Czech military rather than fight the invading Hungarian forces. Its poorly armed forces along with unarmed gymnasium and seminary students set out by the Sich proved to be no match for the Hungarian military, which by March 18, 1939 had captured all of Carpatho-Ukraine. During this fighting hundreds of Carpathian Sich members died in battle while they slowly retreated until they got in conflict with the Polish border guards and most of them died on the other side of the Carpathians.

In September 1939, 600 veterans of the Sich were authorized by German intelligence (the Abwehr) to form a battalion-sized combat unit that participated in the German invasion of Poland. It was disbanded soon afterwards.

The Carpathian Sich is celebrated as a symbol of bravery and resistance against fascism in Ukraine.

Numbers and organization
Carpathian Sich (Karpatska Sich) (also the Carpathian Sich National Defense Organization). A paramilitary organization in Carpatho-Ukraine in 1938–9, formed in November 1938 from units of the Ukrainian National Defense (organized in Uzhhorod by Ukrainian nationalists and headed by Stepan Rosokha). The leadership of the Carpathian Sich consisted of the command (commander, D. Klempush; deputy-commander, I. Roman) and the staff of officers. The organization's headquarters were in Khust, and there were 10 individual district commands with subordinate local sections, which conducted military and political training involving several thousand men. 

Five permanent garrisons conducted regular military training, and a number of the Sich soldiers served in the local police force and with the border guards. The Carpathian Sich adopted uniforms and ranks modeled on those of military formations in Ukraine during the struggle for independence (1917–20). It was also involved in cultural and educational work among the local population: its members organized the artistic group Letiucha Estrada and published the weekly Nastup, edited by Rosokha. The Sich held general and district conventions, the largest of which, consisting of several thousand participants, took place in Khust in February 1939.

A significant number of Galician Ukrainians (who entered illegally from Poland), together with emigrants from Dnieper Ukraine, joined the local Ukrainians as officers and soldiers in the permanent garrisons of the Carpathian Sich. After Carpatho-Ukraine's proclamation of independence, the Sich became its national army (Col Serhii O. Yefremov, commander; Col Mykhailo Kolodzinsky, chief of staff) and, in March 1939, mounted an armed resistance to the Hungarian invasion. At that time the strength of the Sich was about 2,000 men. Several hundred of them died in battles against the Czechs (13 March) and the Hungarians (14–18 March). 

Overwhelmed by the Hungarian army, the soldiers either retreated to Romania and Slovakia or hid in the mountains. The Romanians turned over many of the soldiers to the Hungarians, who in turn gave up many Galicians to the Poles and kept the remainder as prisoners. Illegal executions of prisoners were perpetrated. The struggle of the Carpathian Sich against the Hungarians was the first armed conflict in central Europe to precede the Second World War.

(See also Transcarpathia.)
By February 1939 the Sich had up to 15,000 members, although only 2,000 were organized to fight.  The Sich had five garrisons.   Its barracks housed a total of 2,000 people, of whom only 300-400 were armed.
Its ranks were called Otaman (commander), Sotnyk (company (sotnya) commander), Chotar (Platoon (chota) Commander), Desiatnyk (corporal), Starshy Sichovyk (Senior Private) and Sichovyk (private). Uniforms were adopted in February 1939 and consisted of a four button tunic with open collar and breeches. Insignia were not standardized.  The Sich used Czech arms.

2019 official veteran status 
In late March 2019 former Carpathian Sich soldiers (and other living former members of irregular Ukrainian nationalist armed groups that were active during World War II and the first decade after the war) were officially granted the status of veterans. This meant that for the first time they could receive veteran benefits,  including free public transport, subsidized medical services, annual monetary aid, and public utilities discounts, and will enjoy the same social benefits as former Ukrainian soldiers Red Army of the Soviet Union.

There had been several previous attempts to provide former Ukrainian nationalist fighters with official veteran status, especially during the 2005-2009 administration President Viktor Yushenko, but all failed.

References

External links
 Vehesh, M. Carpathian Sich (КАРПАТСЬКА СІЧ, ОРГАНІЗАЦІЯ НАРОДНОЇ ОБОРОНИ КАРПАТСЬКА СІЧ). Encyclopedia of History of Ukraine. 2007

20th century in Ukraine
History of Carpathian Ruthenia
Military history of Ukraine
Ukrainian nationalist organizations
Ukrainian independence movement
Carpatho-Ukraine